James Benjamin Saxe is an American computer scientist who has worked for many years at the DEC Systems Research Center and its successors, the Compaq Systems Research Center and the Systems Research Center of HP Labs.

Saxe is known for his highly-cited publications on
automated theorem proving,
circuit complexity,
retiming in synchronous circuit design,
computer networks,
and static program analysis.
His work on program analysis from PLDI 2002 won the Most Influential PLDI Paper Award for 2012.
In addition, he is one of the authors of the master theorem for divide-and-conquer recurrences.

While a high school student, Saxe won the United States of America Mathematical Olympiad.
In 1974, as a student at Union College, Saxe took part in the William Lowell Putnam Mathematical Competition; his place in the top five scores earned him a Putnam Fellowship.
He graduated from Union College in 1976,,
and earned his Ph.D. in 1985 from Carnegie Mellon University, under the supervision of Jon Bentley.

Selected publications

References

Year of birth missing (living people)
Living people
American computer scientists
Union College (New York) alumni
Carnegie Mellon University alumni
Putnam Fellows
Scientists from New York (state)